Revagupti (pronounced rēvagupti) is a rāgam in Carnatic music (musical scale of South Indian classical music). It is a pentatonic scale (audava rāgam or owdava rāgam). It is a janya rāgam (derived scale), as it does not have all the seven swaras (musical notes).

It is a morning rāgam.  The similar scales in Hindustani music are Rewa and Bibhas.

Structure and Lakshana 

Revagupti is a symmetric rāgam that does not contain madhyamam or nishādham. It is a symmetric pentatonic scale (audava-audava ragam in Carnatic music classification – audava meaning 'of 5'). Its ascending and descending scale ( structure) is as follows:

 : 
 : 

The notes used in this scale are shadjam, shuddha rishabham, antara gandharam, panchamam and shuddha dhaivatham, as per Carnatic music notation and terms for the swaras. Revagupti is considered a janya rāgam of Mayamalavagowla, the 15th Melakarta rāgam, though it can be derived from 5 other melakarta rāgams by dropping both the madhyamam and nishādham.

Popular Compositions 
Here are a few songs composed in Revagupti.

Gopalaka Pahimam is popular krithi rendered in this raga nowadays, though originally it was set in the raga Bhupalam by Maharaja Swathi Thirunal
Griha bala memi composed by Tyagaraja
Sada vinatu sadare by Muthuswami Dikshitar
Ni vera ganidhi and Purushottamuda by Annamacharya

Film Songs

Language:Tamil

Related rāgams 
This section covers the theoretical and scientific aspect of this rāgam.

Scale similarities 
Bhupalam rāgam differs from Revagupti only by the gāndhāram. It uses sadharana gāndhāram instead of antara gāndhāram and its  structure is S R1 G2 P D1 S : S D1 P G2 R1 S
Bhauli rāgam uses an additional nishadam in descending scale, in comparison to Revagupti. Its  structure is S R1 G3 P D1 S : S N3 D1 P G3 R1 S
Karnataka Shuddha Saveri rāgam uses shuddha madhyamam in place of antara gandharam of Revagupti. Its  structure is S R1 M1 P D1 S : S D1 P M1 R1 S

Notes

References 

Janya ragas